Drillia albomaculata is a species of sea snail, a marine gastropod mollusk in the family Drilliidae.

The database Gastropods.com states that this species is a synonym of Pilsbryspira zebroides (Weinkauff, H.C., 1884)

Description

Distribution
This species occurs in the demersal zone of the Caribbean Sea, off Jamaica.

References

 Tucker, J.K. 2004 Catalog of recent and fossil turrids (Mollusca: Gastropoda). Zootaxa 682:1–1295

albomaculata
Gastropods described in 1845